Ciliellopsis oglasae is a species of air-breathing land snails, terrestrial pulmonate gastropod mollusks in the family Hygromiidae, the hairy snails and their allies.

This species is endemic to Italy.  Its natural habitat is temperate forests. It is threatened by habitat loss.

References

Ciliellopsis
Molluscs of Europe
Endemic fauna of Italy
Gastropods described in 1990
Taxonomy articles created by Polbot